On the Jews and Their Lies (in modern spelling ) is a 65,000-word anti-Judaic and antisemitic treatise written in 1543 by the German Reformation leader Martin Luther (1483–1546).

Luther's attitude toward Jews took different forms during his lifetime. In his earlier period, until 1537 or not much earlier, he wanted to convert Jews to Lutheranism (Protestant Christianity). In his later period when he wrote On the Jews and Their Lies, he denounced them and urged their persecution.

In the treatise, he argues that Jewish synagogues and schools be set on fire, their prayer books destroyed, rabbis forbidden to preach, homes burned, and property and money confiscated. Luther claimed they should be shown no mercy or kindness, afforded no legal protection, and "these poisonous envenomed worms" should be drafted into forced labor or expelled for all time. He also seems to advocate their murder, writing "[W]e are at fault in not slaying them".

The book may have had an impact on creating later antisemitic German thought. With the rise of the Nazi Party in Weimar Germany, the book became widely popular among its supporters. During World War II, copies of the book were commonly seen at Nazi rallies, and the prevailing scholarly consensus is that it may have had a significant impact on justifying the Holocaust. Since then, the book has been denounced by many Lutheran churches.

Content
In the treatise, Martin Luther describes Jews as a "base, whoring people, that is, no people of God, and their boast of lineage, circumcision, and law must be accounted as filth". Luther wrote that they are "full of the devil's feces ... which they wallow in like swine", and the synagogue is an "incorrigible whore and an evil slut".

In the first ten sections of the treatise, Luther expounds, at considerable length, upon his views concerning Jews and Judaism and how these compare to Protestants and Protestant Christianity. Following the exposition, Section XI of the treatise advises Protestants to carry out seven remedial actions, namely:

 to burn down Jewish synagogues and schools and warn people against them
 to refuse to let Jews own houses among Christians
 to take away Jewish religious writings
 to forbid rabbis from preaching
 to offer no protection to Jews on highways
 for usury to be prohibited and for all Jews' silver and gold to be removed, put aside for safekeeping, and given back to Jews who truly convert
 to give young, strong Jews flail, axe, spade, and spindle, and let them earn their bread in the sweat of their brow

Luther's essay consistently distinguishes between Jews who accept Christianity (with whom he has no issues) and Jews who practise Judaism (whom he excoriates viciously).

The tract specifically acknowledges that many early Christians, including prominent ones, had a Judaic background.

Evolution of Luther's views

Medieval Church and the Jews

Early in his life, Luther had argued that Jews had been prevented from converting to Christianity by the proclamation of what he believed to be an impure gospel by the Catholic Church, and he believed they would respond favorably to the evangelical message if it were presented to them gently. He expressed concern for the poor conditions in which they were forced to live, and insisted that anyone denying that Jesus was born a Jew was committing heresy.

Luther's first known comment about Jewish people is in a letter written to Reverend Spalatin in 1514:

In 1519, Luther challenged the doctrine Servitus Judaeorum ("Servitude of the Jews"), established in Corpus Juris Civilis by Justinian I in 529. He wrote: "Absurd theologians defend hatred for the Jews. ... What Jew would consent to enter our ranks when he sees the cruelty and enmity we wreak on them – that in our behavior towards them we less resemble Christians than beasts?"

In his commentary on the Magnificat, Luther is critical of the emphasis Judaism places on the Torah, the first five books of the Old Testament. He states that they "undertook to keep the law by their own strength, and failed to learn from it their needy and cursed state". Yet, he concludes that God's grace will continue for Jews as Abraham's descendants for all time, since they may always become Christians. "We ought ... not to treat the Jews in so unkindly a spirit, for there are future Christians among them."

In his 1523 essay That Jesus Christ Was Born a Jew, Luther condemned the inhuman treatment of Jews and urged Christians to treat them kindly. Luther's fervent desire was that Jews would hear the gospel proclaimed clearly and be moved to convert to Christianity. Thus he argued:

Against the Jews
In August 1536, Luther's prince, John Frederick, Elector of Saxony, issued a mandate that prohibited Jews from inhabiting, engaging in business in, or passing through his realm. An Alsatian shtadlan, Rabbi Josel of Rosheim, asked a reformer, Wolfgang Capito, to approach Luther in order to obtain an audience with the prince, but Luther refused every intercession. In response to Josel, Luther referred to his unsuccessful attempts to convert Jews: "I would willingly do my best for your people but I will not contribute to your [Jewish] obstinacy by my own kind actions. You must find another intermediary with my good Lord." Heiko Oberman notes this event as significant in Luther's attitude toward Jews: "Even today this refusal is often judged to be the decisive turning point in Luther's career from friendliness to hostility toward the Jews"; yet, Oberman contends that Luther would have denied any such "turning point". Rather he felt that Jews were to be treated in a "friendly way" in order to avoid placing unnecessary obstacles in their path to Christian conversion, a genuine concern of Luther.

Paul Johnson writes that "Luther was not content with verbal abuse. Even before he wrote his anti-Semitic pamphlet, he got Jews expelled from Saxony in 1537, and in the 1540s he drove them from many German towns; he tried unsuccessfully to get the elector to expel them from Brandenburg in 1543."

Michael Berenbaum writes that Luther's reliance on the Bible as the sole source of Christian authority fed his later fury toward Jews over their rejection of Jesus as the messiah. For Luther, salvation depended on the belief Jesus was Son of God, a belief that adherents of Judaism do not share. Graham Noble writes that Luther wanted to save Jews, in his own terms, not exterminate them, but beneath his apparent reasonableness toward them, there was a "biting intolerance", which produced "ever more furious demands for their conversion to his own brand of Christianity". (Noble, 1–2) When they did not convert, he turned on them.

History since publication
The prevailing scholarly view since the Second World War is that the treatise exercised a major and persistent influence on Germany's attitude toward its Jewish citizens in the centuries between the Reformation and the Holocaust. Four hundred years after it was written, the Nazis displayed On the Jews and Their Lies during Nuremberg rallies, and the city of Nuremberg presented a first edition to Julius Streicher, editor of the Nazi newspaper Der Stürmer, the newspaper describing it, on Streicher's first encounter with the treatise in 1937, as the most radically antisemitic tract ever published.

Against this view, theologian Johannes Wallmann writes that the treatise had no continuity of influence in Germany, and was in fact largely ignored during the 18th and 19th centuries. Hans Hillerbrand argues that to focus on Luther's role in the development of German antisemitism is to underestimate the "larger peculiarities of German history".

In May 1948, antisemite Gerald L. K. Smith put out an English translation called "The Jews and Their Lies", which was published under the name "Christian Nationalist Crusade".

Since the 1980s, some Lutheran church bodies have formally denounced and dissociated themselves from Luther's vitriol about Jews. It has to distance itself from every [expression of] anti-Judaism in Lutheran theology."

See also

 Martin Luther and antisemitism
 Antisemitism in Christianity
 On the Jewish Question

References
Notes

Bibliography

Bainton, Roland. Here I Stand: A Life of Martin Luther. Nashville: Abingdon Press, 1978. .
Brecht, Martin. Martin Luther, 3 vols. Minneapolis: Fortress Press, 1985-1993.
Gavriel, Mardell J. The Anti-Semitism of Martin Luther: A Psychohistorical Exploration. Ph.D. diss., Chicago School of Professional Psychology, 1996.
Goldhagen, Daniel. Hitler's Willing Executioners. Vintage, 1997. .
Gritsch, Eric W. Martin Luther's Anti-Semitism: Against His Better Judgement. Grand Rapids, MI: William B. Eerdmans Publishing Company, 2012. .
Halpérin, Jean, and Arne Sovik, eds. Luther, Lutheranism and the Jews: A Record of the Second Consultation between Representatives of The International Jewish Committee for Interreligious Consultation and the Lutheran World Federation Held in Stockholm, Sweden, 11–13 July 1983. Geneva: LWF, 1984.
Johnson, Paul. A History of the Jews. New York: HarperCollins Publishers, 1987. .
Kaennel, Lucie. Luther était-il antisémite? (Luther: Was He an Antisemite?). Entrée Libre N° 38. Geneva: Labor et Fides, 1997. .
Kaufman, Thomas. Lesley Sharpe and Jeremy Noakes trans. Luther's Jews. Oxford: Oxford University Press, 2017. .
Kittelson, James M. Luther the Reformer: The Story of the Man and His Career. Minneapolis: Augsburg Publishing House, 1986. .
Luther, Martin. The Jews and Their Lies. Los Angeles: Christian Nationalist Crusade, 1948.
Oberman, Heiko A. The Roots of Anti-Semitism in the Age of Renaissance and Reformation. James I. Porter, trans. Philadelphia: Fortress Press, 1984. .
Rosenberg, Elliot, But Were They Good for the Jews? (New York: Birch Lane Press, 1997). .
Roynesdal, Olaf. Martin Luther and the Jews. Ph.D. diss., Marquette University, 1986.
Rupp, Gordon. Martin Luther: Hitler's Cause or Cure? In Reply to Peter F. Wiener. London: Lutterworth Press, 1945.
Siemon-Netto, Uwe. The Fabricated Luther: the Rise and Fall of the Shirer Myth. Peter L. Berger, Foreword. St. Louis: Concordia Publishing House, 1995. .
Siemon-Netto, Uwe. "Luther and the Jews". The Lutheran Witness 123 (2004) No. 4:16–19. (PDF)
Steigmann-Gall, Richard. The Holy Reich: Nazi Conceptions of Christianity, 1919-1945. Cambridge University Press, 2003. .
Tjernagel, Neelak S. Martin Luther and the Jewish People. Milwaukee: Northwestern Publishing House, 1985. .
Wallmann, Johannes. "The Reception of Luther's Writings on the Jews from the Reformation to the End of the 19th Century." Lutheran Quarterly 1 (Spring 1987) 1:72–97.
Wiener, Peter F. Martin Luther: Hitler's Spiritual Ancestor, Hutchinson & Co. (Publishers) Ltd., 1945;

External links

Luther's Letter to Bernhard, a Converted Jew (1523)
On the Jews and Their Lies

1543 books
16th-century Christian texts
Antisemitic publications
Controversies in Christian literature
Early Modern Christian anti-Judaism
Lutheranism and antisemitism
Protestantism-related controversies
Works by Martin Luther

de:Martin Luther und die Juden#Von den Juden und ihren L.C3.BCgen .28Januar 1543.29